East Rock Park is a park in the city of New Haven and the town of Hamden, Connecticut that is operated as a New Haven city park. The park surrounds and includes the mountainous ridge named East Rock and was developed with naturalistic landscaping. The entire  park is listed on the National Register of Historic Places.

Description

East Rock is a popular outdoor recreation destination among residents and visitors of the greater New Haven region. Views from the clifftops span metropolitan New Haven, Long Island Sound, and Long Island. The park is open year-round to hikers and walkers. The automobile road is open April 15 to November 1, 8 a.m. to sunset and November 1 to March 31, Friday, Saturday, Sunday, and holidays, 8 a.m. to 4 p.m., weather permitting. Activities permitted in the park include hiking, snowshoeing, cross-country skiing, picnicking, bicycling (on roads and city-designated mountain bike trails only), boating (on the Mill River), bird watching, and dog walking. Rock climbing, swimming, and alcoholic beverages are prohibited. A number of hiking trails traverse the ridge, most notably the Giant Steps Trail which ascends to the summit at a near-vertical pitch from the south. At the foot of the mountain are located football, baseball, and soccer fields, tennis courts, basketball courts, and playgrounds. The Trowbridge Environmental Center is open Thursdays and Fridays from 10:00 am to 5:00 pm, and at least one Saturday a month for public programs; it offers displays and information about the geology and ecosystem of East Rock. The Pardee Rose Garden and Greenhouse features roses and other flowering plants from spring to fall, and is a popular place to shoot wedding pictures.

The park's layout is the work of Donald Grant Mitchell and the Olmsted Brothers. The covered bridge is named after A. Frederick Oberlin, a local hero of the First World War.

The Friends of East Rock Park organization, founded in 1982, is a community and environmental advocacy group that assists with park maintenance by hosting social events and volunteer work days.

National Register of Historic Places 
The National Register of Historic Places listing for East Rock Park recognizes six contributing buildings, one other contributing structure, six contributing objects and one contributing site The park's historic, contributing elements include:
English Gate, c. 1890, at View Street, with trap rock
Pardee Rose Garden, 1922, on State Street
Bishop Gate, c. 1890, on State Street, with trap rock
Director's Residence, c. 1900
Sheep Barn, c. 1900, a large Colonial/Shingle-style building
Queen Anne Barn, c. 1900
Greenhouses, 1920s
Soldiers' and Sailors' Monument, from 1887, a 122-foot monument at the summit
Whitney Gate, c. 1890 on Whitney Avenue, with brownstone
Walls, c. 1900
East Rock Road Bridge, a steel arch span bridge from the 1940s
There are also a contributing storage shed and a number of non-contributing buildings.

See also 
East Rock (neighborhood)
Cedar Hill (New Haven)
 Mill River (Connecticut)
National Register of Historic Places listings in New Haven, Connecticut
National Register of Historic Places listings in New Haven County, Connecticut

References

External links

East Rock Park - City of New Haven
Geocaching in East Rock and the surrounding area

Parks in New Haven, Connecticut
Hamden, Connecticut
National Register of Historic Places in New Haven, Connecticut
Historic districts in New Haven County, Connecticut
Queen Anne architecture in Connecticut
Shingle Style architecture in Connecticut
Historic districts on the National Register of Historic Places in Connecticut
Parks on the National Register of Historic Places in Connecticut